Merlyn Orville Valan (October 27, 1926 – December 15, 2010) was an American politician and farmer.

Valan was born in Kurtz Township, Clay County, Minnesota. He graduated from Comstock High School in Comstock, Minnesota, in 1945. Valan also went to North Dakota State College of Science in Wahpeton, North Dakota. Valan served in the United States Navy and was stationed in Guam. He lived in Moorhead, Minnesota with his wife and family and was a farmer. Valan worked for the United States Department of Agriculture and for the Minnesota Department of Agriculture. Valan served as the chief clerk for the Minnesota Senate. Valan then served in the Minnesota House of Representatives from 1979 to 1986 and was a Republican. Valan died at Eventide Lutheran Home in Moorhead, Minnesota.

References

1926 births
2010 deaths
People from Moorhead, Minnesota
Farmers from Minnesota
Military personnel from Minnesota
North Dakota State College of Science alumni
Employees of the Minnesota Legislature
Republican Party members of the Minnesota House of Representatives
United States Department of Agriculture people